Lonchophylla inexpectata is a species of leaf-nosed bat found in Brazil.

References

Lonchophylla
Bats of Brazil
Endemic fauna of Brazil